Caryophyllales is a diverse and heterogeneous order of flowering plants that includes the cacti, carnations, amaranths, ice plants, beets, and many carnivorous plants. Many members are succulent, having fleshy stems or leaves. The betalain pigments are unique in plants of this order and occur in all its families with the exception of Caryophyllaceae and Molluginaceae.

Description
The members of Caryophyllales include about 6% of eudicot species. This order is part of the core eudicots. Currently, the Caryophyllales contains 37 families, 749 genera, and 11,620 species The monophyly of the Caryophyllales has been supported by DNA sequences, cytochrome c sequence data and heritable characters such as anther wall development and vessel-elements with simple perforations.

Circumscription
As with all taxa, the circumscription of Caryophyllales has changed within various classification systems.  All systems recognize a core of families with centrospermous ovules and seeds.  More recent treatments have expanded the Caryophyllales to include many carnivorous plants.

Systematists were undecided on whether Caryophyllales should be placed within the rosid complex or sister to the asterid clade. The possible connection between sympetalous angiosperms and Caryophyllales was presaged by Bessey, Hutchinson, and others; as Lawrence relates: "The evidence is reasonably conclusive that the Primulaceae and the Caryophyllaceae have fundamentally the same type of gynecia, and as concluded by Douglas (1936)(and essentially Dickson, 1936) '...the vascular pattern and the presence of locules at the base of the ovary point to the fact that the present much reduced flower of the Primulaceae has descended from an ancestor which was characterized by a plurilocular ovary and axial placentation. This primitive flower might well be found in centrospermal stock as Wernham, Bessy, and Hutchinson have suggested.' "

Caryophyllales is separated into two suborders: Caryophyllineae and Polygonineae. These two suborders were formerly (and sometimes still are) recognized as two orders, Polygonales and Caryophyllales.

APG IV
Kewaceae, Macarthuriaceae, Microteaceae, and Petiveriaceae were added in APG IV.

APG III
As circumscribed by the APG III system (2009), this order includes the same families as the APG II system (see below) plus the new families, Limeaceae, Lophiocarpaceae, Montiaceae, Talinaceae, and Anacampserotaceae.

 family Achatocarpaceae 
 family Aizoaceae 
 family Amaranthaceae 
 family Anacampserotaceae 
 family Ancistrocladaceae 
 family Asteropeiaceae 
 family Barbeuiaceae 
 family Basellaceae 
 family Cactaceae 
 family Caryophyllaceae 
 family Didiereaceae 
 family Dioncophyllaceae 
 family Droseraceae 
 family Drosophyllaceae 
 family Frankeniaceae 
 family Gisekiaceae 
 family Halophytaceae 
 family Kewaceae
 family Limeaceae 
 family Lophiocarpaceae
 family Macarthuriaceae
 family Microteaceae 
 family Molluginaceae 
 family Montiaceae 
 family Nepenthaceae 
 family Nyctaginaceae 
 family Petiveriaceae 
 family Physenaceae 
 family Phytolaccaceae 
 family Plumbaginaceae 
 family Polygonaceae 
 family Portulacaceae 
 family Rhabdodendraceae 
 family Sarcobataceae 
 family Simmondsiaceae 
 family Stegnospermataceae 
 family Talinaceae 
 family Tamaricaceae

APG II
As circumscribed by the APG II system (2003), this order includes well-known plants like cacti, carnations, spinach, beet, rhubarb, sundews, venus fly traps, and bougainvillea.  Recent molecular and biochemical evidence has resolved additional well-supported clades within the Caryophyllales.

 order Caryophyllales 
 family Achatocarpaceae
 family Aizoaceae
 family Amaranthaceae 
 family Anacampserotaceae (added in APG III)
 family Ancistrocladaceae
 family Asteropeiaceae
 family Barbeuiaceae
 family Basellaceae 
 family Cactaceae 
 family Caryophyllaceae 
 family Didiereaceae
 family Dioncophyllaceae
 family Droseraceae
 family Drosophyllaceae
 family Frankeniaceae
 family Gisekiaceae
 family Halophytaceae
 family Limeaceae (added in APG III)
 family Lophiocarpaceae (added in APG III)
 family Molluginaceae 
 family Montiaceae (added in APG III)
 family Nepenthaceae
 family Nyctaginaceae
 family Physenaceae
 family Phytolaccaceae
 family Plumbaginaceae
 family Polygonaceae
 family Portulacaceae 
 family Rhabdodendraceae
 family Sarcobataceae
 family Simmondsiaceae
 family Stegnospermataceae
 family Talinaceae (added in APG III)
 family Tamaricaceae

APG

 

This represents a slight change from the APG system, of 1998
 order Caryophyllales
 family Achatocarpaceae
 family Aizoaceae
 family Amaranthaceae
 family Ancistrocladaceae
 family Asteropeiaceae
 family Basellaceae
 family Cactaceae
 family Caryophyllaceae
 family Didiereaceae
 family Dioncophyllaceae
 family Droseraceae
 family Drosophyllaceae
 family Frankeniaceae
 family Molluginaceae
 family Nepenthaceae
 family Nyctaginaceae
 family Physenaceae
 family Phytolaccaceae
 family Plumbaginaceae
 family Polygonaceae
 family Portulacaceae
 family Rhabdodendraceae
 family Sarcobataceae
 family Simmondsiaceae
 family Stegnospermataceae
 family Tamaricaceae

Cronquist

The Cronquist system (1981) also recognised the order, with this circumscription:
 order Caryophyllales
 family Achatocarpaceae
 family Aizoaceae
 family Amaranthaceae
 family Basellaceae
 family Cactaceae
 family Caryophyllaceae
 family Chenopodiaceae
 family Didiereaceae
 family Nyctaginaceae
 family Phytolaccaceae
 family Portulacaceae
 family Molluginaceae

The difference with the order as recognized by APG lies in the first place in the concept of "order".  The APG favours much larger orders and families, and the order Caryophyllales sensu APG should rather be compared to subclass Caryophyllidae sensu Cronquist.

A part of the difference lies with what families are recognized. The plants in the Stegnospermataceae and Barbeuiaceae were included in Cronquist's Phytolaccaceae. The Chenopodiaceae (still recognized by Cronquist) are included in Amaranthaceae by APG.

New to the order (sensu APG) are the Asteropeiaceae and Physenaceae, each containing a single genus, and two genera from Cronquist's order Nepenthales.

Earlier circumscriptions
Earlier systems, such as the Wettstein system, last edition in 1935, and the Engler system, updated in 1964, had a similar order under the name Centrospermae.

References

External links

Tree of Life Characteristics and Phylogenetic Relationships

 
Angiosperm orders